Safdarjung Hospital is a multi-specialty hospital, and the largest central government hospital in India if measured by bed strength. It is associated with Vardhman Mahavir Medical College and located in the heart of New Delhi on the Ring Road, opposite to the All India Institute of Medical Sciences (AIIMS). Until the inception of All India Institute of Medical Science in 1956, Safdarjung Hospital was the only tertiary care hospital in Delhi. In 1962, it became a centre of training and teaching for post-graduate students of the University of Delhi. From 1973 to 1990, the hospital and its faculty was associated with University College of Medical Sciences. But with the establishment of Indraprastha University in 1998, the hospital was later merged with the Vardhman Mahavir Medical College.

Academics
The courses offered by the institute are:
 M.B.B.S. (Annual intake of 150 students)
 MD/MS 
 DM/M.Ch.
DNB 
 BSc (Hons.) in Nursing (Annual intake of 70 students in BSc Nursing)

Medical facilities

Laparoscopic Cholecystectomy 
The hospital has an eminent faculty of Surgeons in the department of Surgery. As prevalent, Cholecystectomy (removal of gall bladder ) was being contemplated by the conventional method using a 5” to 8” incision. This resulted  in considerable postoperative pain, increased hospital stay for more than 7–10 days, a delayed ambulatory period and prolonged recovery time.

In an attempt to minimise the above drawbacks of conventional Cholecystectomy an attempt was made with MiniLap Cholecystectomy through a single 6-8 cms incision. This was performed in 150 cases and the results were presented at the International College of Surgeons conference in London in November 1994 by Dr. N. C. Bose, Consultant and Head of Department of Surgery, Safdarjung Hospital. However, this procedure was abandoned shortly thereafter due to its limitations of difficult dissection.

The search for a technically safe process which was easier to perform and enhanced patients’ comfortability, led to the introduction of Laparoscopic Cholecystectomy through keyhole incision. This high-tech surgery was contemplated through single or multiple keyhole incisions resulting in minimal postoperative pain, early ambulation and hospital discharge within 24 hrs’ with fastest recovery.

In Safdarjung Hospital, Dr. N. C. Bose, Consultant & Head of Surgery, along with his junior colleague Dr. S. V. Arya, Specialist in Surgery, were instrumental in the establishment of Laparoscopic Cholecystectomy operative procedure in February 1994. The duo performed 100 cases without any morbidity or mortality until June 1997. This procedure commonly known as Lap Chole is currently a gold standard for Cholecystectomy.

History

American troops came to India during the Second World War and landed at the nearby Safdarjung airport, the only airport in Delhi at that time and then known as Willingdon Airfield. There was no hospital in the area where this hospital is situated. Some barracks were rapidly constructed south of the airport to establish a medical centre for American troops fighting in this region. The hospital was well equipped, with x-ray machine, a laboratory and other facilities for various emergency procedures. After the Second World War was over, America handed over the hospital to the Indian government and it is now known as Safdarjung Hospital. Later a medical college was started there by Central Government Health Scheme of the Health Ministry.

AIIMS was started in 1956 but there was no medical college in old Delhi until 1959 when Maulana Azad Medical College was started at Delhi Gate.

References

External links

 Safdarjung Hospital & Medical College Official website

Hospital buildings completed in 1942
Hospitals in Delhi
Colleges of the Guru Gobind Singh Indraprastha University
Hospitals established in 1942
New Delhi
1942 establishments in India
20th-century architecture in India